Torre Europa (Torres Europa) - generally, is the name of five skyscrapers of complex buildings in L'Hospitalet de Llobregat (suburb of Barcelona), Spain, with numbers from 1 to 5. However, the Torre Europa 1 has name of Torre Inbisa, the Torre Europa 2 has name of Torre Zenit and both these towers are over 100 meters tall. Other buildings is Torre Europa 3, Torre Europa 4 and Torre Europa 5. Torre Europa 3, 4, 5 has 19 floors and rises 75 meters. All these towers are lies on Plaza de Europa.

See also 
 Torre Inbisa (Torre Europa 1)
 Torre Zenit (Torre Europa 2)
 List of tallest buildings and structures in Barcelona

References 

Skyscrapers in Barcelona
Residential skyscrapers in Spain
Residential buildings completed in 2009